Compressor is a video and audio media compression and encoding application for use with Final Cut Studio and Logic Studio on macOS. It can be used with Qmaster for clustering, or configured as a server to work on the jobs submitted by other computers on the network.

History
The application used to be available as part of Final Cut Pro, Soundtrack Pro, Motion, and DVD Studio Pro, and after Apple combined its professional media products into Final Cut Studio and Logic Studio bundles, Compressor became available as part of them.

Once the bundle model was abandoned by Apple in 2011, a new major version of Compressor (Compressor 4) was released as a separate product on the Mac App Store for $49.99.

Features
Compressor is used for encoding video and audio media in multiple formats, including HEVC (H.265), MPEG-1, MPEG-2 for DVD, QuickTime .mov, MPEG-4 (Simple Profile), MPEG-4 H.264 and optional (third Party and often commercial) QuickTime Exporter Components to export to Windows Media. Among its other features are the ability to convert from NTSC to PAL and vice versa, and the ability to upscale from standard-definition video to high-definition video with feature detail detection to prevent serious quality losses. Filters and effects, such as de-noising or timestamp generation, can be applied to video during the conversion process, and the video can be cropped.

With its update to 4.2 in April 2015, Apple added performance upgrades, as well as the ability to use Compressor to produce a compliant package to submit video content for distribution to the iTunes Store.

References

External links and references 
 Apple Compressor 4
 Apple Compressor 2 User Manual (PDF)
 New Features in Compressor 2 (PDF)

MacOS-only software made by Apple Inc.